is a train station in Arakawa, Tokyo, Japan, operated by Keisei Electric Railway and Tokyo Metro.

Lines
 Keisei Electric Railway - Machiya Station
 Keisei Main Line
 Tokyo Metro - Machiya Station
 Chiyoda Line
 Tokyo Metropolitan Bureau of Transportation (Toei) - Machiya-ekimae Station
 Tokyo Sakura Tram

Keisei

The Keisei Main Line station consists of a single island platform serving two tracks. There is a waiting room in the center of the platform. Until October 2002, express trains stopped at the station.

Platforms

Tokyo Metro

The Chiyoda Line station consists of two underground split platforms, with the Yoyogi-Uehara platform on the upper level and the Ayase platform on the lower level.

Platforms

Toei

The Tokyo Sakura Tram station consists of two side platforms serving two tracks.
The station was previously named Machiya-itchome station.

History

1 April 1913 - Ōji Electric Tramway (now Toden Arakawa line) station opens
19 December 1931 - Keisei Electric Tramway (now Keisei Electric Railway) station opens
20 December 1969 - Chiyoda subway line station opens
1 April 2004 - Ownership of station facilities on the Chiyoda Line were transferred to Tokyo Metro after the privatization of the Teito Rapid Transit Authority (TRTA).
17 June 2010 - Station numbering was introduced to all Keisei Line stations; Machiya was assigned station number KS03.

Surrounding area

 Arakawa Sizen Park
 Mikawashima Sewage Treatment Center
 Machiya Bunka Center

Connecting bus services
Machiya-ekimae (Machiya Station) (Toei Bus)
No.1
 Kusa 41: for Adachi-umedachō

No.2
 Kusa 41: for Asakusa-kotobukichō

Machiya Station (Keisei Bus)
 Minami-sen 01, 02: for Minami-Senju Station West Entrance
 Machiya 04, 05: for Kodomo-katei-shien Center and Shim-Mikawashima Station
 Machiya 05: for Ogubashi (Kumanomae Station)

See also
 List of railway stations in Japan

References

This article incorporates information from the corresponding article in the Japanese Wikipedia.

Railway stations in Japan opened in 1931
Railway stations in Tokyo
Tokyo Metro Chiyoda Line
Keisei Main Line
Arakawa, Tokyo